The Stevens School is a historic school building located at York, York County, Pennsylvania.  It was designed by architect John A. Dempwolf and built in 1889–1890.  It is a 2 1/2-story, red-orange brick building in the Romanesque Revival style.  It is in the form of a Latin cross and has a slate covered hipped roof. It features terra cotta ornamentation.  It was named for Congressman Thaddeus Stevens (1792 - 1868).  The building was converted to apartments.

It was added to the National Register of Historic Places in 1983.

See also
National Register of Historic Places listings in York County, Pennsylvania

References

School buildings on the National Register of Historic Places in Pennsylvania
Romanesque Revival architecture in Pennsylvania
School buildings completed in 1890
Buildings and structures in York, Pennsylvania
National Register of Historic Places in York County, Pennsylvania